The Câlniștea is a right tributary of the river Neajlov in Romania. It discharges into the Neajlov in Călugăreni. It flows through the villages Botoroaga, Târnava, Tunari, Drăgănești-Vlașca, Bujoreni, Răsuceni, Prunaru, Carapancea, Naipu, Cămineasca, Schitu, Mirău, Stoenești, Ianculești, Hulubești, Uzunu and Călugăreni.

Tributaries

The following rivers are tributaries to the river Câlniștea:

Left: Mutu, Câlniștea Mică, Cenușarul, Letca, Râiosul, Glavacioc
Right: Slătioarele, Valea Albă, Valea lui Damian, Valea Porumbenilor, Ismar, Râcu, Iordana

References

Rivers of Romania
Rivers of Teleorman County
Rivers of Giurgiu County